Aesiocopa is a genus of moths belonging to the subfamily Tortricinae of the family Tortricidae.

Species
Aesiocopa grandis
Aesiocopa necrofolia
Aesiocopa vacivana (Zeller, 1877)

Former species
Aesiocopa concavata  Meyrick 1930
Aesiocopa patulana Walker

See also
List of Tortricidae genera

References

External links

tortricidae.com
Catalogue of life
Beebe, William, 1947 Scale adaptation and utilization in Aesiocopa patulana Walker. Zoologica : 147-152
Organism Names

Sparganothini
Tortricidae genera